The Madone di Càmedo is a mountain of the Swiss Lepontine Alps, overlooking Cevio in the canton of Ticino.

References

External links
 Madone di Càmedo on Hikr

Mountains of the Alps
Mountains of Switzerland
Mountains of Ticino
Lepontine Alps